William Throckmorton Bromley ( – 3 March 1769) was an English politician, MP for Warwickshire 1765–1769.

Bromley was the son of William Bromley  (son of William Bromley , Speaker of the House of Commons) and his wife Lucy Throckmorton, daughter of Sir Clement Throckmorton.

He was educated at Westminster School, and matriculated at Christ Church, Oxford in 1744, aged 17.

Bromley was elected MP for Warwickshire in a by-election in February 1765, without a contest. He voted against the repeal of the Stamp Act 1765. He was re-elected in 1768.

He died on 3 March 1769.

Family
In May 1756, Bromley married Bridget Davenport, daughter of Richard Davenport. They had one son:
 William Davenport Bromley (died 1810)

References

1720s births
1769 deaths
People educated at Westminster School, London
Alumni of Christ Church, Oxford
British MPs 1761–1768
British MPs 1768–1774